4034 Vishnu is a rare-type asteroid classified as near-Earth object and potentially hazardous asteroid of the Apollo group, approximately  in diameter. It was discovered on 2 August 1986, by American astronomer Eleanor Helin at Palomar Observatory in California, United States. It is named after the Hindu deity Vishnu.

Naming 

This minor planet was named for the four-armed god of protection and preservation of good, Vishnu, one of the principal deities of Hinduism. The asteroid's name was proposed by Belgian amateur astronomer and professional meteorologist Jean Meeus. The approved naming citation was published by the Minor Planet Center on 15 July 2011.

Classification and orbit 

Vishnu orbits the Sun at a distance of 0.6–1.5 AU once every 1 years and 1 month (398 days). Its orbit has an eccentricity of 0.44 and an inclination of 11° with respect to the ecliptic. As no precoveries were taken, and no prior identifications were made, the body's observation arc begins with its official discovery observation at Palomar in 1986.

Its highly eccentric orbit crosses the orbits of all inner planets except that of Mercury, which effectively makes it a Venus-crosser, Earth-crosser and Mars-crosser all at once. From 1800 to 2200, Vishnu has made and will make multiple approaches of Venus (71×), Earth (29×), and Mars (7×) within 30 gigameters. It has been observed by radar astronomy (Binzel) and the orbital solution includes non-gravitational forces.

Physical parameters 

In the SMASS taxonomy, Vishnu is a rare O-type asteroid, meaning it is similar to the asteroid 3628 Boznemcová, which is the best asteroid match to the spectra of L6 and LL6 ordinary chondrite meteorites. These L and LL chondrites have lower iron metal content, but higher iron oxide content in the silicates.

In the early 2000s, Vishnu has been observed in the thermal-infrared by the Keck telescope on Mauna Kea, Hawaii. The asteroid measures approximately 420 meters in diameter and its surface has a high albedo of 0.520. As of 2017, Vishnu rotation period and shape remain unknown as no lightcurves have yet been obtained.

References

External links 
 Asteroid Lightcurve Database (LCDB), query form (info )
 Dictionary of Minor Planet Names, Google books
 Asteroids and comets rotation curves, CdR – Observatoire de Genève, Raoul Behrend
 
 
 

004034
Discoveries by Eleanor F. Helin
Named minor planets
004034
004034
19860802